Powelliphanta fiordlandica, one of the amber snails, is a species of large, carnivorous land snail, a terrestrial pulmonate gastropod mollusc in the family Rhytididae.

Conservation status
Powelliphanta fiordlandica is classified by the New Zealand Department of Conservation as being Nationally Vulnerable.

References
 Powell A W B, New Zealand Mollusca, William Collins Publishers Ltd, Auckland, New Zealand 1979 

Gastropods of New Zealand
Powelliphanta
Gastropods described in 1971
Endemic fauna of New Zealand
Endemic molluscs of New Zealand